Albert King (1923–1992) was an American blues guitarist and singer who was active from the late 1940s to 1992.  During the earlier part of his career, he recorded several singles for smaller record labels.  In 1966, he began an association with Stax Records, where he enjoyed his greatest commercial success with both singles and albums.  After Stax's bankruptcy in 1975, King recorded for several smaller labels.  Meanwhile, his former record companies issued a number of live recordings, compilations, and re-packaged material.  This trend accelerated after King's death in 1992, resulting in some charting releases as well as the inevitable redundancies.

Albums 1962–1992

Studio albums

Live albums

Compilation albums

Posthumous albums (since 1993)

Live albums

Selected compilation albums
Numerous Albert King compilation albums issued by a number of record companies have been released over the years (AllMusic shows over 100 compilations).  The following lists some of the more notable and current releases:

Singles 1954–1992

Footnotes

References

Bibliography

Discographies of American artists
Blues discographies